A paren is a parenthesis.

Paren, Paren' or PAREN may also refer to:
Paren, Kamchatka Krai, a village in Kamchatka Krai, Russia
Paren (river), a river in northeastern Russia
Paren knife, a knife produced in the Russian village
Paren space, a blank typographic unit equal to the size of a parenthesis
National Rebirth Party, a political party in Burkina Faso